Mount Nyangani (formerly Mount Inyangani) is the highest mountain in Zimbabwe at . The remainder of the peak is a broad moor of mainly rolling hills and plateau with an area of about 8 km2. The edges of this plateau then fall steeply to the east and west sides. The mountain vegetation is largely composed of heath around the summit plateau with evergreen forest along the wetter eastern slopes and grassland to the western side. Annual rainfall totals are high (around ) but long spells of dry weather occur during the winter period of May to August. Due to its relatively low altitude and tropical location, snow falls very rarely, last recorded in August 1935.

Geology
The mountain is composed of an upper sill of dolerite and sandstone, with the harder dolerite forming cliffs and ridges.  The dolerite sill and the sediments underlying it are probably part of the Umkondo Group. The Umkondo Group dolerite sill north of Nyangani, on the Kwaraguza Road, has been dated at 1099 Ma

Access
The mountain can be accessed from four base points within Nyanga National Park:

(1) The official car park, at the base of the Tourist Route. This is reached from Circular Drive.

(2) The Mountain Club of Zimbabwe hut, on the Kwaraguza Road, accessed via Circular Drive.

(3) Nyazengu Substation of Nyanga National Park, accessed via a road which goes south from just before the official car park.

(4) Gleneagles Substation of Nyanga National Park, accessed via the Circular Drive, Kwaraguza Road and the Gleneagles road or from Troutbeck via Nyafaru.

Mountain hikes

The peak can be reached within 1–3 hours by anyone of average fitness. The hazards here are produced by bewilderingly fast weather changes that can switch from sunny skies to thick fog, and under these conditions several fatalities have occurred due to hikers losing their way and falling down ravines. There are three ascents that follow paths:

 The main access to the mountain is a Tourist Path from the west. This ascends along the edge of the upper Nyamuziwa river and crosses onto the main plateau north of the summit. From there it heads south across the plateau to the summit.
 A second path runs from the Mountain Club of Zimbabwe hut. This paths follows the east side of the northern ridge, before joining the Tourist Path on the main plateau.
 A third path runs from Nyazengu, southwest of the mountain on the old road to the Pungwe River causeway (Pungwe Drift). It branches from the Nyazengu Trail and ascends to the base of Tucker's Gap, which has views of the montane rainforest to the southeast of the mountain (on the few days when the cloud does not cover the Gap). It is possible to ascend the north side of the gap (marked path) and then walk northwards across a boulder field to the main plateau, approaching the summit from the south. However, this last stretch has no path or markings.

The mountain can also be ascended using the following routes which do not have paths or markings:

 The north-eastern ridge, between the Nyama and Kairezi Rivers. This route starts from the Gleneages Road, between the Nyama and Kairezi causeways, and follows a ridge up to the main plateau, northeast of the summit and east of the Tourist Path.
 Via Little Nyangani. This route starts from Gleneagles Substation, and ascends the heavily vegetated slope of Little Nyangani mountain, which lies to the east of the main plateau. From Little Nyangani, one can descend west to a rainforest-covered saddle, then ascend west onto the main plateau via Kairezi Falls, reaching the main plateau east of the summit.

The above are all walks or scrambles, without rock climbing involved. This may well be the cause for a number of disappearances on the mountain, such as that of two teenage children of the then Minister of Finance, Tichaendepi Masaya.

Rivers and waterfalls

Three rivers have their sources on Mount Nyangani: the Nyamuziwa River, the (Kairezi) Gairezi River and the Pungwe River. The first two are tributaries of the Mazowe River, which is itself a tributary of the Zambezi River.

The Nyama River, a tributary of the Kayirezi, falls off the main plateau in a waterfall on the northeast of the mountain and the Gairezi Falls are located on the east edge of the main plateau.

Fauna
The fauna of the area is described under Nyanga National Park. Additional information:

 The clawless otter is common in the upper Gairezi River, near the mountain 
 The Inyangani River Frog is an endangered amphibian named for the mountain. It can be found in rocky, fast-flowing streams in the montane grassland.

Flora
 Protea asymmetrica, or the Inyanga sugarbush, is endemic to the area.
 Afrosciadium rhodesicum, a species of flowering carrot, is endemic to the area.

Archaeology

Iron Age ruins have been found on Little Nyangani and on a hill west of the summit, the latter better-preserved, but not on the summit plateau itself.

In popular culture
The film Mysteries of Mount Inyangani looks at some of the mysteries and myths about the mountain.

See also
 Geography of Zimbabwe
 List of mountains

References

External links
 "Inyangani, Zimbabwe" on Peakbagger

Eastern Highlands
Eastern Zimbabwe montane forest-grassland mosaic
Geography of Manicaland Province
Highest points of countries
Nyangani
Mutasa District
Nyanga District